The CWA Intercontinental Heavyweight Championship was the secondary singles title in the German professional wrestling promotion the Catch Wrestling Association. The title was active from 1991 through the promotion's close in 2000. The championship was contested under 10 three-minute rounds.

Title history
Key

See also
Catch Wrestling Association

Footnotes

References

Catch Wrestling Association championships
Heavyweight wrestling championships
Intercontinental professional wrestling championships